The Water Babies is a 1978 live action-animated family film directed by Lionel Jeffries and starring James Mason, Bernard Cribbins, Billie Whitelaw, Joan Greenwood, David Tomlinson, Tommy Pender, and Samantha Gates. It is very loosely based on the book The Water-Babies, A Fairy Tale for a Land Baby by Charles Kingsley.

Plot
Tom is a 12 year old orphan living in York in the mid-19th century. He is taken under the wing of Grimes, a roguish chimney sweep, as he is small enough to climb inside the chimneys. One day, they leave town and go to Harthover Hall, a huge country house set in vast grounds. Grimes rides a donkey - Tom and Grimes' assistant Masterman walk alongside.

At the house, Tom gets lost in the maze of chimneys and appears in a young girl's bedroom (Elly). Meanwhile Grimes is passing silverware out of the windows to Masterman. When discovered by the housekeeper Grimes blames the crime on Tom who makes a run for it with his dog Toby. They are pursued across the estate, and end up at Dead Man's Pool: a deep pool in a fast flowing river. Although the young girl protests his innocence Tom jumps in with the dog.

The film then switches to a fantasy animation of speaking sea-creatures. Here he must help rescue his new friends, the Water Babies, from enslavement by sharks. This section includes multiple musical sequences mainly involving Jock the Scottish lobster, Terence the English seahorse and Claude the French swordfish. The story jumps to a cave in Antarctica where they join forces with Cyril the Walrus, a group of polar bears, and a flock of penguins; and also encounter the sea king Kraken also known to many as Neptune and Poseidon.

In the end, Kraken returns Tom and Toby to their world for self-sacrificing for others instead of choosing their own needs. On their world, Tom proves his innocence and helps capture Grimes. He is then adopted by Elly's family.

Cast
James Mason as Mr. Grimes
Bernard Cribbins as Mr. Masterman
Billie Whitelaw as Mrs. Doasyouwouldbedoneby/Old Crone/Mrs. Tripp/Woman in Black/Water Babies 'Gate Keeper'
Joan Greenwood as Lady Harriet
David Tomlinson as Sir John
Tommy Pender as Tom
Samantha Gates as Elly
Paul Luty as Sladd

Voices
James Mason as Killer Shark
Bernard Cribbins as Electric Eel
David Tomlinson as Polar Bear
Samantha Gates as Ariadne the Water Baby
Paul Luty as Claude the Swordfish
Jon Pertwee as Salmon/Jock the Lobster/Kraken
Lance Percival as Terence the Seahorse
David Jason as Cyril the Walrus
Olive Gregg
Cass Allan
Liz Proud
Una Stubbs

Production
Producer Peter Shaw read the book in 1972 and thought it would make a good film. However, he was unsure how to tackle the film technically and was concerned about how to turn the book into a script. He and writer Michael Robson took some  time adapting the book. Key changes were made including adding a sidekick for the evil sweeper Grimes and having the villains get their comeuppance in the real world as well as the fantasy world.

Shaw toyed with the idea of using special effects then decided to create the underwater sequences via animation. "We had the perfect excuse," said Shaw. "The surface of the water becomes the boundary between live action and fantasy."

Shaw looked into hiring animators in Hollywood, but found them to be too expensive, so made a deal with a Polish company. The Poles did the animation while the British did the story, soundtrack, working designs and characters. The budget for the film was raised entirely in England, and the film was shot without a distributor.

It was filmed on location in Yorkshire, England in November 1976. Primarily based at Denton Hall, Wharfedale, early scenes are filmed in the city of York. Post-production took many months, due to incorporating the animated sequences.

Collins Colour Cubs also published four children's books based on the movie; Tom the Little Chimney Sweep, Tom Becomes A Water-Baby, Tom in The Undersea World and Tom and Ellie. In addition a novelization of the movie was published  the same year as an Armada paperback (ISBN 10: 0006914357 / 13: 9780006914358).

References

External links 
 
The Water Babies at TCMDB

1978 films
1978 animated films
1970s fantasy films
Animated films based on children's books
British children's animated films
British children's fantasy films
British fantasy films
1970s British animated films
1970s children's fantasy films
Films directed by Lionel Jeffries
Films with live action and animation
1970s children's animated films
1970s English-language films
1970s British films
Films based on works by Charles Kingsley